Community-led total sanitation (CLTS) is an approach used mainly in developing countries to improve sanitation and hygiene practices in a community. The approach tries to achieve behavior change in mainly rural people by a process of "triggering", leading to spontaneous and long-term abandonment of open defecation practices. It focuses on spontaneous and long-lasting behavior change of an entire community. The term "triggering" is central to the CLTS process: It refers to ways of igniting community interest in ending open defecation, usually by building simple toilets, such as pit latrines. CLTS involves actions leading to increased self-respect and pride in one's community. It also involves shame and disgust about one's own open defecation behaviors. CLTS takes an approach to rural sanitation that works without hardware subsidies and that facilitates communities to recognize the problem of open defecation and take collective action to clean up and become "open defecation free".

The concept was developed around the year 2000 by Kamal Kar for rural areas in Bangladesh. CLTS became an established approach around 2011. Non-governmental organizations were often in the lead when CLTS was first introduced in a country. Local governments may reward communities by certifying them with "open defecation free" (ODF) status. The original concept of CLTS purposefully did not include subsidies for toilets as they might hinder the process.

CLTS is practiced in at least 53 countries. CLTS has been adapted to the urban context. It has also been applied to post-emergency and fragile states settings.

Challenges associated with CLTS include the risk of human rights infringements within communities, low standards for toilets, and concerns about usage rates in the long-term. CLTS is in principle compatible with a human rights based approach to sanitation but there are bad practice examples in the name of CLTS. More rigorous coaching of CLTS practitioners, government public health staff and local leaders on issues such as stigma, awareness of social norms and pre-existing inequalities are important. People who are disadvantaged should benefit from CLTS programmes as effectively as those who are not disadvantaged.

Definitions

Open defecation is the practice of defecating out in the open, rather than using a toilet.

"Open defecation free" (ODF) is a central term for community-led total sanitation (CLTS) programs. It primarily means the eradication of open defecation in the entire community. However, ODF can also include the additional criteria, such as:
 Household latrines or toilets are hygienic, provide the safe containment of feces, offer privacy and a roof to protect the user, have a lid to cover the hole, or a water seal for toilets.
 All household members and all members of the community use these latrines or toilets.
 A handwashing facility with water, soap or ash is nearby and used regularly.

Even more stringent criteria which may be required before a community is awarded "ODF status" might include:
Safe drinking water and storage.
Food hygiene.
Greywater disposal.
Solid waste management.
Provision of toilets for schools, markets, clinic or visitors to the community.

Overview

CLTS focuses on community-wide behavioural change, rather than merely toilet construction. The process raises the awareness that as long as even a minority continues to defecate in the open, everyone is at risk of disease. CLTS uses community-led methods, such as participatory mapping and analyzing pathways between feces and the mouth (fecal-oral transmission of disease), as a means of teaching the risks associated with OD. 
 
A tool called "triggering" is used to propel people into taking action. This takes place over a day with a team of facilitators. The team visits a community which is identified as practicing open defecation and encourages villagers to become aware of their own sanitation situation. This aims to cause disgust in participants, and the facilitators help participants to plan appropriate sanitation facilities.

Using the term "shit" (or other locally used crude words) during triggering events or presentations – rather than feces or excreta – is a deliberate aspect of the CLTS approach, as it is meant to be a practical, straight forward approach rather than a theoretical, academic conversation.

CLTS is practiced in at least 53 countries. To be successful in the longer term, CLTS should be treated as part of a larger WASH (water, sanitation and hygiene) strategy rather than as a singular solution to changing behavior.

Phases

Pre-triggering 
Pre-triggering is the process by which communities are assessed to be suitable for CLTS intervention. This involves visits and a number of different criteria, which are used to identify communities likely to respond well to triggering. During pre-triggering, facilitators introduce themselves to community members and begin to build a relationship.

Triggering
The "CLTS Handbook" from 2008 states that there is no "one way" of doing triggering in CLTS. A rough sequence of steps is given in this handbook which could be followed. Facilitators are encouraged to modify and change activities depending on the local situation.

The UNICEF manual approved for use of CLTS in Sierra Leone suggests the following steps for the triggering process:
 Visit the community, emphasising the purpose of learning about their sanitation situation
 Facilitate "Kaka Mapping" – drawing a map of important locations in the village, then adding common sites for defecation
 Pretend to leave
 Facilitate a "Walk of Shame" to sites with frequent Open Defecation
 Collect a piece of feces in a bag
 Put feces on the ground where all present can see it, and discuss how flies move between food and feces
 Wait for the shocked realization that the community is indirectly eating each other's feces
 Put some feces into a water bottle and ask if anyone would drink it
 Calculate how much feces is produced each day and ask where it goes
 Ignition (see below)
 Wait for the emergence of "Natural Leaders" to work with in order to develop a plan of action.

The "ignition" phase occurs when the community becomes convinced that there is a real sanitation problem, and motivated to do something about it. Natural Leaders are members of the community who are engaged by the process, and able to drive change.

The goal of the triggering process is to let people see the problem first-hand, thereby evoking disgust. However, it has been reported that communities which respond favorably tend to be motivated more by improved health, dignity, and pride than by shame or disgust.

Post-triggering
After a positive response to the ignition phase, NGO facilitators work with communities to deliver sanitation services by providing information and guidance relevant to the local situation.

There are many challenges that occur in the post-triggering phase. These are mainly related to the supply of durable and affordable latrine hardware and technical support on latrine construction. Toilet owners may need advice how to upgrade and improve sanitation and handwashing facilities using local materials.

Subsidies 
The original concept of CLTS did not include subsidies for toilets. CLTS proponents at that time believed that provoking behavior change in the people alone would be sufficient to lead them to take ownership of their own sanitation situation, including paying for and constructing their own toilets. This was not always the case.

Applications to urban situations, schools and other settings 
Since about 2016, CLTS has been adapted to the urban context. For example, in Kenya the NGOs Plan and Practical Action have implemented a form of urban CLTS. CLTS has also been used in schools and the surrounding communities, which is referred to as "school-led total sanitation". The school children act as messengers of change to households.

CLTS has also been applied to post-emergency and fragile states settings. There has been some experience with this in Haiti, Afghanistan, Pakistan, Philippines  and Indonesia. In 2014, UNICEF reported positive outcomes with CLTS in fragile and insecure contexts, namely in Somalia and South Sudan.

People who are disadvantaged should benefit from CLTS programmes as effectively as those who are not disadvantaged. This is referred to as equality and nondiscrimination (EQND).

Outcomes and health aspects 
Millions of people worldwide have benefitted from CLTS which has resulted reductions in open defecation and increases in latrine coverage in many rural communities. Practitioners have declared many villages as "ODF villages", where ODF stands for "open defecation free".

Reviews of effectiveness 
A systematic review of 200 studies concluded in 2018 that the evidence base on CLTS effectiveness is still weak. This means that practitioners, policy makers, and program managers have little available evidence to inform their actions.

There is currently a lack of scientific review about the effectiveness of CLTS, although this has been changing since 2015. A study in 2012 reviewed reports by NGOs and practitioners and found that there was little review of the impact of local Natural Leaders, that anecdotes were used without assessing impacts, and that claims were made without supporting evidence. It concluded that these kinds of reports focus on the 'triggering' stage of CTLS instead of the measurable outcomes. A peer-reviewed article considered the sustainability of CLTS in the longer term: It found that there was little monitoring or evaluation of the impacts of CLTS, even though large international organizations were involved in funding the process.

Reviews about the effectiveness of CLTS to eliminate open defecation, reduce diarrhea and other gastrointestinal diseases, and decrease stunting in children are currently underway. In some cases, CLTS has been compared with India's Total Sanitation Campaign (TSC) when assessing the effectiveness of the approach. However, this comparison may be invalid, as the presence of subsidies in the TSC process may fundamentally change the effectiveness of the CLTS process.

Comparison of different CLTS programmes 
One small study compared different CLTS programmes. Participants from NGOs involved in delivering CLTS reported that although they included some of the activities described in the guidance materials, they often omitted some and included others depending on the local situation. Some reported that subsidies were included, and some offered specific design and construction options.

Health outcomes 
A cluster-randomized controlled trial in rural Mali conducted during 2011 to 2013 found that CLTS with no monetary subsidies did not affect diarrhea incidences, but substantially increased child growth (thereby reducing stunting), particularly in children under two years of age.

Challenges and difficulties

Human rights 
The CLTS behavioral change process is based on the use of shame. This is meant to promote collective consciousness-raising of the severe impacts of open defecation and trigger shock and self-awareness when participants realize the implications of their actions. The triggering process can however infringe the human rights of recipients, even if this was not intended by those promoting CLTS. There have been cases of fines (monetary and non-monetary), withholding of entitlements, public taunting, posting of humiliating pictures and even violence. In some cases CLTS successes might be based on coercion only. On the other hand, CLTS is in principle compatible with a human rights based approach to sanitation but there are bad practice examples in the name of CLTS. More rigorous coaching of CLTS practitioners, government public health officials and local leaders on issues such as stigma, awareness of social norms and pre-existing inequalities are important.

Catarina de Alburquerque, the former United Nations Special Rapporteur on the Right to Water and Sanitation, is quoted as saying that "Observers have also recognized that incentives for encouraging behavior change and the construction of latrines are sometimes unacceptable, and include public shaming, including photographing, of those who still practice open defecation."

More debate is still needed regarding humans rights consequences of posttriggering punitive measures.

Toilet standards and toilet types 
CLTS does not specify technical standards for toilets. This is a benefit in terms of keeping the costs of constructing toilets very low and allowing villagers to start building their own toilets immediately. However, it can produce two problems: first in flood plains or areas near water tables, poorly constructed latrines are likely to contaminate the water table and thus represent little improvement. Second, long-term use of sanitation facilities is related to the pleasantness of the facilities, but dirty overflowing pits are unlikely to be utilised in the longer term. A related issue here is that CLTS does not address the issue of latrine emptying services or where they exist, how they dispose of waste. This has led some researchers to say that the success of CLTS is largely down to the cultural suitability of the way it is delivered and the degree to which supply-side constraints are addressed.

If villagers do not know about alternative toilet options (like urine-diverting dry toilets or composting toilets), and are not told about these options by the facilitators of the CLTS process, they may opt for pour flush pit latrines even in situations where groundwater pollution is a significant problem.

Reuse of treated excreta as fertiliser 
Feces are given a strong negative connotation in the CLTS approach. This can cause confusion for villagers who are already using treated human excreta as a fertiliser in agriculture and can, in fact, discourage the reuse of human excreta.

Long-term usage rates (sustainability) 
There is also concern about the number of people who go back to open-defecation some months after having been through the CLTS process. A Plan Australia study from 2013 investigated that 116 villages were considered Open Defecation Free (ODF) following CLTS across several countries in Africa. After two years, 87% of the 4960 households had fully functioning latrines – but these were considered the most basic and none of the communities had moved up the sanitation ladder. 89% of households had no visible excreta in the vicinity, but only 37% had handwashing facilities present. When broader criteria for declaring communities ODF was used, an overall "slippage rate" of 92% was found. Some researchers suggest that this means support is needed to support communities to upgrade facilities in ODF villages which have been triggered by CLTS.

A study in 2018 has found little evidence for sustained sanitation behavior change as a result of CLTS.

History

In 1999 and 2000, Kamal Kar was working in a village called Mosmoil in Rajshahi, Bangladesh, and decided that a system of attitudinal changes by villagers might have a longer-lasting effect than the existing top-down approach involving subsidies from NGOs and government. The Bangladeshi government began a programme of installing expensive latrines in the 1970s, but the government decided this was too costly, and many of the original latrines were abandoned.   In the 1990s, a social mobilisation plan was begun to encourage people to demand and install better sanitation systems, but early success did not last, according to Kar.  At that point Kar, a participatory development expert from India, was brought in by Wateraid and he concluded that the problem with previous approaches was that local people had not "internalised" the demand for sanitation.  He suggested a new approach: abandoning subsidies and appealing to the better nature of villagers and their sense of self-disgust to bring about change.  The CLTS Foundation is the organisation set up by Kar to promote these ideas. Kar and Robert Chambers stated in their 2008 CLTS Handbook:

In time, NGOs and governments began to see the value of the approach and ran their own schemes in various countries, some with less aversion to subsidies than Kamal Kar. Community-led Total Sanitation as an idea had grown beyond its founder and is now often being run in slightly different ways, e.g. in India, Pakistan, Philippines, Nepal, Sierra Leone and Zambia. Non-governmental organizations (NGOs) were often in the lead when CLTS was first introduced in a country. India was an exception – here the government led the somewhat similar "Total Sanitation Campaign" which has been turned into the "Clean India Mission" or Swachh Bharat Abhiyan in 2014.

It eventually became standard practice for NGOs to leave the community quite soon after "triggering" activities. When communities took the lead, change in sanitation practices was more longer term and sustainable.

CLTS as an idea now has many supporters around the world, with Robert Chambers, co-writer of the CLTS Foundation Handbook, describing it this way:

The Institute of Development Studies (IDS) coordinated research programme on CLTS since about 2007 and regards it as a "radically different approach to rural sanitation in developing countries which has shown promising successes where traditional rural sanitation programmes have failed".

Today there are many NGOs and research institutes with an interest in CLTS, including for example the CLTS Knowledge Hub of the Institute of Development Studies, the CLTS Foundation led by Kamal Kar, The World Bank, Wateraid, Plan USA and the Water Institute at UNC, SNV from the Netherlands and UNICEF.

CLTS has spread throughout Bangladesh and to many other Asian and African countries with financial support from the Water and Sanitation Program of the World Bank, DFID, Plan International, WaterAid, CARE, UNICEF and SNV. Large INGOs and many national NGOs have also been involved. Many governments have in the meantime initiated CLTS processes or made it a matter of national policy.

The concept originally focused mainly on provoking shame and disgust about open defecation. It also involved actions leading to increased self-respect and pride in one's community. With time, CLTS evolved away from provoking negative emotions to educating people about how open defecation increases the risk of disease. Currently, CLTS triggering events focus more on promoting self-respect and pride.

See also
 Ecopsychology
 Orangi Pilot Project
Self-supply of water and sanitation
 Swachh Bharat Abhiyan (Clean India Mission)
WASH (Water, sanitation and hygiene)

References

External links
CLTS Knowledge Hub at Institute for Development Studies (IDS) in the UK
 CLTS Foundation by Kamal Kar
 Publications on CTLS in the library of the Sustainable Sanitation Alliance (SuSanA)
 Testing CLTS Approaches for Scalability

Rural community development
Sewerage
Sanitation